Tanya Fir  (born 1975) is a Canadian politician who was elected in the 2019 Alberta general election to represent the electoral district of Calgary-Peigan in the 30th Alberta Legislature. She is a member of the United Conservative Party. On April 30, 2019, she was appointed to be the Minister for Economic Development, Trade and Tourism in the Executive Council of Alberta, holding that role until August 25, 2020.

In August 2018, Fir beat former Ontario MP Jeff Watson and past Wildrose candidate Jeevan Mangat to secure her party's nomination. Her nomination campaign manager was longtime provincial Conservative party organizer Craig Chandler.

In January 2021, Fir was found to be vacationing in Las Vegas despite the ongoing COVID-19 pandemic and advisory against nonessential travel. She was demoted from her parliamentary duties as a result.

Electoral record

References

1975 births
United Conservative Party MLAs
Living people
Women MLAs in Alberta
People from Cranbrook, British Columbia
Politicians from Calgary
Members of the Executive Council of Alberta
Women government ministers of Canada
21st-century Canadian politicians
21st-century Canadian women politicians